Colli del Tronto ("Tronto's hills") is a comune (municipality) in the Province of Ascoli Piceno in the Italian region Marche, located about  south of Ancona and about  northeast of Ascoli Piceno.

Colli del Tronto borders the following municipalities: Ancarano, Ascoli Piceno, Castorano, Spinetoli.

Demographic evolution

References

External links
 www.provincia.ap.it/comuni/colli/convegni.asp

Cities and towns in the Marche